Ten Scars Make a Man is a 1924 American adventure film serial written by Phillip Barry and directed by William Parke. The film is considered to be lost.

Cast
 Allene Ray as Jean Morell
 Jack Mower as Jack O'Day
 Rose Burdick as Rita Morell
 Frank Whitson as Henry O'Day
 Larry Steers as Edgar Venable
 Leon De La Mothe as Luther Candle (as Leon Kent)
 Harry Woods as Buck Simpson
 Frank Lanning as Aztinca

See also
 List of film serials
 List of film serials by studio
 List of lost films

References

External links

Ten Scars Make a Man at SilentEra

1924 films
1924 lost films
American silent serial films
1924 adventure films
American black-and-white films
Pathé Exchange film serials
Lost American films
American adventure films
Lost adventure films
1920s American films
Silent adventure films